Nabnasset is a village located in the northeastern portion of Westford, Massachusetts, between North Chelmsford, Tyngsboro, Graniteville and Westford Center.

The village is predominantly smaller homes near Nabnasset Lake, although there are no clear village boundaries.

The Nabnasset area of Westford MA is known of its schools of Nabnasset Grade School (Old Nab) and Nabnasset Elementary School (Nab). The area also contains Edward's Beach, a beach to Nabnasset Lake located on Williams Road and is free to Westford residents but will cost non-residents $5.00.

External links
Nabnasset on Google Maps

Villages in Middlesex County, Massachusetts
Villages in Massachusetts